The 1958 FA Cup final was contested on 3 May 1958 by Bolton Wanderers and Manchester United at Wembley Stadium, London, in front of a crowd of almost 100,000. The referee was J. Sherlock. Bolton won 2–0, with a double by Nat Lofthouse, who scored the goals in the 3rd and 55th minutes. United, who had lost the previous final to Aston Villa, had been decimated three months earlier in the Munich air disaster, and fielded only four crash survivors, along with several newcomers. Just two players featured in the United side from the previous year's final; six of them were among the dead (along with two others who had not played), two were injured to such an extent that they never played again, while another had not yet fully recovered from his injuries.

The second Bolton goal was a source of considerable controversy as it resulted from the Manchester United goalkeeper Harry Gregg being bundled over the goal line by Lofthouse. Goalkeepers were, at that time, much less protected from physical contact with opponents. The resulting debate was one of the high-profile incidents that led eventually to the situation that prevails nowadays where no contact with the opposing goalkeeper is permitted.

Not one of Bolton's 11 players in the cup-winning team cost the club a transfer fee. Five of them were full internationals. Only Nat Lofthouse and Doug Holden remained from the Bolton team that lost to Blackpool in the Matthews Final five years earlier.

Road to Wembley
As First Division clubs, both teams entered the competition at the third round stage.

 Square brackets [ ] represent the opposition's division

Match details

References

FA Cup Finals
Fa Cup Final
Fa Cup Final 1958
Fa Cup Final 1958
Fa Cup Final
Fa Cup Final